CHOC-FM is a French-language radio station that broadcasts at 88.7 MHz FM in Saint-Raymond de Portneuf, Quebec, Canada.

History
In 2018, a group from the region led by Michel Lambert filed for a new radio station to serve the Portneuf regional county municipality. The CRTC deemed that there was room for one new commercial outlet there, and since no other party had filed, it approved his application for licence on October 25, 2019.

Per the application, the station first broadcast an adult contemporary format with hits from 1965 to today, along with two public affairs programs and a specialty country music show on the weekends. The station slightly changed ownership and its format in 2021, turning into a mix of classic rock and classic pop.

On May 10, 2022, the CRTC denied an application by 11733630 Canada Inc. to operate a new FM transmitter at 103.7 MHz in Saint-Augustin-de-Desmaures, Quebec.

References

External links
 

Hoc
Radio stations established in 2020
2020 establishments in Quebec